Uttam Ravji Gada (1948 – 6 June 2020) was an Indian Gujarati and Hindi play and movie story, screenplay and dialogue writer.

A chartered accountant by training, Uttam Gada found fame with his very long running play directed and enacted by Paresh Rawal called "Maharathi" which played in multiple languages and countries. He also wrote mainstream Bollywood movies such as Khiladi 420 and Yun Hota Toh Kya Hota.

He was nominated for Best Screenplay for the film Khiladi 420 in 2001 for the Screen Awards in India.

He died on 6 June 2020 in San Francisco, USA from complications due to chronic lymphocytic leukemia.

Published works

Plays
Full length
 Raafda
 Reshami Tezab
 Maharathi
 Mulraj Mansion
 Chiranjeev
 Vish Rajani
 Pankh Vinana Patangiyan
 Kaya Kalp
 Mahapurush
 Hun Rima Baxi !
 Sathwaro
 Double Savari
 Shirachhed
 Kamla
 Dikri Vahal No Dariyo
 Orange Juice
 Jashrekha
  Tsunami
  Lakhsmi Poojan
 Dear Father
  Arre Vahu ! Have Thayun Bahu 
  Five Star Aunty 
  Whatsup 
   Yugpurush 
 Karl Marx in Kalbadevi 

Short
  Hairpin
  Bhinan Paanan
 Rango
 Security
 System
  Positive Thinking
 Fire Wall
  Red Sea

Movies
 Khiladi 420
 Yun Hota Toh Kya Hota (2006)
 Maharathi (2008)
 Straight! (2009)

Teleserials
 Time Bomb 9/11 (24 episodes)

Published Books 
 Whats up  — short play collection
  Tourist and other stories  — collection of short stories

References 

1948 births
2020 deaths
Hindi dramatists and playwrights
Indian male dramatists and playwrights
Indian male screenwriters